Belfair State Park is a public recreation area located on Hood Canal  southwest of Belfair in Mason County, Washington. Park activities include camping, fishing, swimming, clam digging, crabbing, birdwatching, and field sports.

References

External links
Belfair State Park Washington State Parks and Recreation Commission 
Belfair State Park Map Washington State Parks and Recreation Commission

Parks in Mason County, Washington
State parks of Washington (state)